The United Evangelical Lutheran Church of Germany (German: Vereinigte Evangelisch-Lutherische Kirche Deutschlands, VELKD) was founded on July 8, 1948, in Eisenach, Germany.  Its total membership is 8.6 million people. The Member Churches of this organization are in full fellowship with the Evangelical Lutheran Church in America (ELCA). All its member churches belong to the Evangelical Church in Germany, with which it co-operates closely. It has recently been reduced from an independent legal entity to an administrative unit within the larger Evangelical Church in Germany.

The seat of the VELKD is in Hanover. The leading bishop (German: Leitender Bischof) is Gerhard Ulrich.

Leading Bishops of the VELKD 

 1948–1949: Wilhelm Henke
 1949–1955: Hans Meiser
 1955–1969: Johannes Lilje
 1969–1975: Hans-Otto Wölber, Land Bishop of Hamburg 
 1975–1978: Eduard Lohse
 1978–1981: Gerhard Heintze
 1981–1990: Karlheinz Stoll
 1990–1993: Gerhard Müller
 1993–1999: Horst Hirschler
 1999–2005: Hans Christian Knuth
 2005–2011: Johannes Friedrich
 since 2011: Gerhard Ulrich

President of the Church Office of the VELKD 
 1949-1963: Heinz Brunotte
 1963- 1967:  Max Keller-Hüschemenger
 *  1968 -   ?  : Hugo Schnell
 1983-2000: Friedrich-Otto Scharbau
 2000-2015: Friedrich Hauschildt ( also Vice-President of the Office of the Evangelical Church in Germany (EKD), between 2007 and 2015)
 since 2015: Horst Gorski (also Vice-President of EKD since 2015)

Members 

Evangelical Lutheran Church in Bavaria
Evangelical Lutheran State Church of Brunswick
Evangelical Lutheran Church of Hanover
Evangelical Lutheran Church in Northern Germany
Evangelical Lutheran Church of Saxony
Evangelical Lutheran State Church of Schaumburg-Lippe
Evangelical Church in Central Germany (since 2009)

Sources

External links
Official Website (in German; English information here)

Lutheran World Federation members
Lutheranism in Germany